The Col. Samuel W. Peel House is a historic house museum, also known as the Peel Mansion Museum, at 400 South Walton Boulevard in Bentonville, Arkansas.  It is a two-story stuccoed brick masonry structure, with a three-story hip-roofed tower at the center of its front facade.  The house was built c. 1875 by Samuel W. Peel, a prominent local politician and businessman.  After serving in the Confederate Army in the American Civil War, Peel studied law and practiced for many years in Bentonville.  He served several terms in the United States Congress, and helped establish the First National Bank of Bentonville.  Despite later alterations, the house is one of the finest Italianate mansions in the region.

The house was listed on the National Register of Historic Places in 1995.  The house is open for tours year-round, with a limited schedule in January and February.

See also
National Register of Historic Places listings in Benton County, Arkansas

References

External links
The Peel Mansion web site

Houses on the National Register of Historic Places in Arkansas
Italianate architecture in Arkansas
Houses completed in 1875
Houses in Bentonville, Arkansas
Museums in Benton County, Arkansas
Historic house museums in Arkansas
National Register of Historic Places in Bentonville, Arkansas
1875 establishments in Arkansas